XHSON-FM is a EDM radio station in Mexico City owned and operated by NRM Comunicaciones. Its 4 regular presenters and 31 resident DJs (alongside several additional guest DJs from time to time) host the station's 24-hour mix of electro-house, techno, trance, progressive, drum and bass, dubstep, house, breaks and other dance and electronica music. It also plays chill-out and lounge music 13 hours a week.

History
The history of 100.9 FM in Mexico City begins with Televideo, S.A., receiving a concession for XEOY-FM in 1957. However, the station didn't come to air until April 18, 1968 and became XEBS-FM, with the on-air name of "La Chica Musical". In the mid-1970s, the station became known as "Sonomil" (a name derived both from its position at 100.9 FM and from XEOY-AM 1000). This name was enshrined in the station's callsign when it became XHSON-FM in 1978.

The format moved toward rock in 1983 and 1984; the station took on the name of Proyecto 101 late in 1983 and then Rock 101 in 1984. The calls changed to XHROK-FM in 1994.

In 1996, however due to low ratings and changes within Núcleo Radio Mil, it was decided to flip formats and become "Código 100.9" with techno music, with the callsign returning to XHSON-FM.

On 1999, the Sabrosita tropical music format moved to 100.9 FM from XEPH-AM 590. The format moved back to AM in 2004, at which time 100.9 FM took on its current format.

It was the only Dance Contemporary radio station in Mexico, with most of its listeners in Mexico City and Cuernavaca, up until 2008 when Núcleo Radio Monterrey launched a sister station in Monterrey.

References

External links
 XHSON-FM, official page

Radio stations in Mexico City
Contemporary hit radio stations in Mexico
Dance radio stations
Electronic dance music radio stations
Radio stations established in 1968
1968 establishments in Mexico